Gråen is a small artificial Swedish island in Øresund, originally constructed during the 18th century both in order to protect Landskrona harbour and for military reasons related to the nearby Landskrona Citadel. A smaller allotments area is located on the island, and access is only by boat. Most of its 50 acres is a bird sanctuary and there are strong trespassing rules between 15 March and 1 August. Only a very few authorised ornithologists are allowed inside the sanctuary during the breeding season (the allotment area is excluded).

Fauna
The breeding birds includes various gulls, mute swans and other water-related birds. Since the early 1980s a cormorant colony (Phalacrocorax carbo) has existed. Unlike some similar colonies at other places in Sweden, these birds have never been disliked by Landskrona's population.

Gipsön
The island's southern part, Gipsön or "The Plaster Island", is an enlargement from the late 1970s, created by the chemical industry Supra AB. The shallow water was surrounded by stones and then filled with plaster, a residue from a process of making fertilizers. The factory was, in its beginning in 1882, located on the island but later moved to the land side of the harbour. Until this part of Gråen was created, all the plaster was dumped in the sea.

References

Artificial islands of Sweden
Ports and harbours of Sweden
Listed buildings in Sweden
Geography of Landskrona
18th century in Skåne County